Brighton & Hove Hockey Club is a field hockey club based in Brighton and Hove, England. The home ground is located at Blatchington Mill School and Sixth Form College.

The men's 1st XI play in the England Hockey League, after gaining promotion to the national league for the first time in 2013. The ladies 1st XI play in the South League. The club has 9 men's sides, 8 ladies' sides, and various other sides. The club has two hybrid pitches at Blatchington Mill that were built in 2012, as well as a clubhouse.

References

English field hockey clubs
Sport in Brighton and Hove